Michael Crane may refer to:
 Michael Crane (cricketer) (born 1982), Bermudian cricketer
 Michael Crane (writer) (born 1961), Australian poet and writer
 Michael Joseph Crane (1863–1928), American prelate of the Roman Catholic Church
 Mike Crane (born 1963), member of the Georgia State Senate
 Mick Crane (died 2022), British rugby league player

See also
 Michael Crain (born 1974), American guitarist